The 1860 United States presidential election in Arkansas took place on November 6, 1860, as part of the 1860 United States presidential election. Arkansas voters chose four representatives, or electors, to the Electoral College, who voted for president and vice president.

Arkansas was won by the 14th Vice President of the United States John C. Breckinridge (SD–Kentucky), running with Senator Joseph Lane, with 53.06% of the popular vote, against Senator John Bell (CU–Tennessee), running with the Governor of Massachusetts Edward Everett, with 37.05% of the popular vote and Senator Stephen A. Douglas (D–Illinois), running with 41st Governor of Georgia Herschel Johnson, with 9.89% of the popular vote.

Republican Party candidate Abraham Lincoln was not on the ballot in the state.

Results

See also
 United States presidential elections in Arkansas

References

Arkansas
1860
1860 Arkansas elections